Elisha Avery Crary (June 24, 1905 – April 28, 1978) was a United States district judge of the United States District Court for the Southern District of California and the United States District Court for the Central District of California.

Education and career

Born in Grundy Center, Iowa, Crary attended the United States Military Academy at West Point, but did not graduate. He received a Bachelor of Arts degree from the University of Southern California in 1929, and a Juris Doctor from the USC Gould School of Law in 1929. He was in private practice in Los Angeles from 1930 to 1941. Having joined the United States Army Reserve in 1931, he served in World War II from 1941 to 1946. He remained in the reserves thereafter until 1957, and was in private practice in Los Angeles from 1946 to 1961. He was a Judge of the Superior Court of Los Angeles County from 1961 to 1962.

Federal judicial service

Crary was nominated by President John F. Kennedy on July 31, 1962, to a seat on the United States District Court for the Southern District of California vacated by Judge Ernest Allen Tolin. He was confirmed by the United States Senate on August 25, 1962, and received his commission on August 28, 1962. He was reassigned by operation of law to the United States District Court for the Central District of California on September 18, 1966, to a new seat authorized by 80 Stat. 75. He assumed senior status on June 24, 1975. His service terminated on April 28, 1978, due to his death from cancer in Newport Beach.

References

Sources
 

1905 births
1978 deaths
Judges of the United States District Court for the Southern District of California
Judges of the United States District Court for the Central District of California
United States district court judges appointed by John F. Kennedy
20th-century American judges
USC Gould School of Law alumni
United States Army soldiers
People from Grundy Center, Iowa
20th-century American lawyers